Tubog sa Ginto is a 1971 Filipino drama film directed by Lino Brocka, based on the comic serials created by Mars Ravelo for Tagalog Klasiks. This is the first film to tackle the then-controversial theme of homosexuality at that time when it was still a very sensitive issue.

Plot

Cast 
Lolita Rodriguez as Emma
Hilda Koronel as Joni
Jay Ilagan as Santi
Eddie Garcia as Don Benito
Luis Gonzales as Celso
Marissa Delgado as Gracita
Mario O'Hara as Diego
Veronica Palileo as Chichi
Jimmy Morato

Production

Release

Reception

Box office

Critical reception

Controversies 
Despite the myriad of research and explanation regarding the "third sex", the society still failed to fully understand the trials and tribulations of a homosexual. The people believed such indistinguishable gender to be a disease in their society, to the point that they label homosexuals as criminals.

The story, written around 1969 to 1970, tackled the issue of "the third sex" which was still a taboo subject matter during the day.  Ravelo was quite critical of that notion that being effeminate as belief was a big disadvantage and scandal causing great embarrassment to the person's family or the entire race.

References

External links 
 
 

Filipino-language films
Tagalog-language films
1971 films
1971 drama films
Philippine LGBT-related films
Films directed by Lino Brocka
Films based on Philippine comics
Philippine films based on comics
Live-action films based on comics
Philippine drama films
1971 LGBT-related films